Reverse domain name notation (or reverse-DNS) is a naming convention for components, packages, types or file names used by a programming language, system or framework. Reverse-DNS strings are based on registered domain names, with the order of the components reversed for grouping purposes. For example, if a company making the product "MyProduct" has the domain name example.com, they could use the reverse-DNS string com.example.MyProduct as an identifier for that product. Reverse-DNS names are a simple way of eliminating namespace collisions, since any domain name is globally unique to its registered owner.

History
The first appearance of reversed DNS strings predated the Internet domain name standards.  The UK Joint Academic Networking Team (JANET) used this order in its Name Registration Scheme, before the Internet domain name standard was established. For example, the name uk.ac.bris.pys.as was interpreted as a host named as within the UK (top level domain .uk), while the Internet standard would have interpreted it as a host named uk within the American Samoa top level domain (.as). During the period while both JANET-style and Internet-style addresses were in use, mailers and gateway sites had ad-hoc workarounds to handle the differences, but could still be confused. 

Reverse-DNS for identifier strings first became widely used with the Java platform.

Examples
Examples of systems that use reverse-DNS notation are:

 Sun Microsystems' Java platform for namespaces
 Apple's Uniform Type Identifier (UTI)
 The Android operating system, for classifying applications (because the Dalvik virtual machine was based on Java)
 dconf, the configuration backend used by GNOME
 The freedesktop.org Desktop Entry Specification

Some examples of reverse-DNS strings are:
 com.adobe.postscript-font, UTI string for Adobe Systems's PostScript fonts
 com.apple.ostype, UTI string for Apple's OSType
 org.omg.CORBA, Java library for CORBA
 org.w3c.dom, Java library for W3C's DOM
 org.kde.dolphin.desktop, a desktop file name

See also 

 Non-Internet email address

References

External links
 Eclipse Naming Conventions
 Re: gnu.* namespace discussion

Domain Name System